Bruce Douglas Anderson (born March 12, 1950) is an American politician and member of the Minnesota Senate. A member of the Republican Party of Minnesota, he represents District 29, which includes portions of Hennepin and Wright Counties in central Minnesota.

Early life, education, and career
Anderson attended North Hennepin Junior College in Brooklyn Park in 1968–69, and received aviation electronics training during his time in the United States Navy in 1970–73. He received an A.A. in agribusiness from Willmar Technical College in 1976, and later earned a B.S. in business management from Northwestern College. He was a sales manager for Centra Sota Cooperative from 1976 to 1986. He was a member of the Minnesota Governor's Advisory Board for Technology for Persons with Disabilities in the 1990s.

Anderson was a member of the Minnesota Air National Guard, and a former Master Sergeant in the United States Air National Guard. He was the 1990 Republican-endorsed candidate for the United States House of Representatives in the old 6th Congressional District.

Minnesota Legislature
Anderson was first elected to the House in 1994, and was reelected every two years until 2010. Before the 2002 legislative redistricting, he represented the old District 19B. He was a member of the House Public Safety Policy and Oversight Committee and the Rules and Legislative Administration Committee. He also served on the Finance subcommittees for the Bioscience and Workforce Development Policy and Oversight Division, the Capital Investment Finance Division, and the Energy Finance and Policy Division.

Anderson was first elected to the Minnesota Senate in 2012.

Personal life
Anderson was married to Dottie until her death in September 2006. He later married Ruth. He has five children and resides in Buffalo Township, Minnesota.

References

External links 

 Official Senate website
 Official campaign website
 Minnesota Public Radio Votetracker: Rep. Bruce Anderson
 Project Votesmart – Rep. Bruce Anderson Profile

1950 births
Living people
People from Buffalo, Minnesota
Military personnel from Minnesota
Republican Party Minnesota state senators
Republican Party members of the Minnesota House of Representatives
University of Northwestern – St. Paul alumni
Politicians from Saint Paul, Minnesota
21st-century American politicians